Æon Flux is an adult animated series.

Æon Flux may also refer to:

 Æon Flux (film), the live action film adaptation of the animated series
 Æon Flux (video game), the video game adaptation of the live action film